{{DISPLAYTITLE:C20H32O6}}
The molecular formula C20H32O6 (molar mass: 368.464 g/mol, exact mass: 368.2199 u) may refer to:

 11-Dehydrothromboxane B2
 Prostaglandin G2

Molecular formulas